Among the Dust of Thieves is a 2013 American drama film about the 1896 disappearance of Albert Jennings Fountain, directed by Sean Pilcher. The film dramatizes the days leading up to Fountain’s disappearance near White Sands, New Mexico and the first, unsuccessful investigation of his apparent murder by John C. Fraser of the Pinkerton Agency. The film strongly suggests that Fountain’s disappearance was directly linked to his prosecution of Oliver M. Lee for cattle rustling. The narrative switches from Fountain’s investigation and arrest of Lee culminating in Fountain’s disappearance, to Fraser’s investigation, which concludes after a shootout at Lee’s ranch.

Plot
Mariana, a granddaughter of Albert Jennings Fountain, discovers her great grandson playing with her grandfather’s clothing and personal possessions. As she begins to tell him of Fountain’s history, the film flashes back to a New Mexico ranch in 1896, where Oliver Lee murders two ranchers and steals their cattle. Fountain, serving as Doña Ana County District Attorney, arrests a member of Lee’s gang in the case, and eventually apprehends Lee despite death threats. After Lee’s arraignment, Fountain is seen leaving town, never to be seen again. Following the disappearance, Pinkerton detective John C. Fraser arrives from Colorado to investigate and discovers Fountain’s wagon, disabled, where there is evidence of a struggle and blood. When suspicion leads to Oliver Lee, Fraser leads a small party to Lee’s ranch where they are ambushed by Lee and his gang. Fraser wounds Lee but ultimately retreats. The film ends with the case unresolved.

Cast
 Tim Maloney as Albert Jennings Fountain
 Chris Norden as Oliver M. Lee
 Algernon D’Ammassa as John C. Fraser
 Bryan Head as Deputy Williams
 Tyler Robinson as Deputy Sheriff Kent Kearney
 Bruce Holbrook as Les Dow
 Kim Kiegel as Mariana
 Joe T. Meier as Jack Maxwell
 Miguel Martinez as Bill McNew
Eric Young as Jim Gililland

Release
This independent film premiered on January 10, 2013, in Mesilla, New Mexico.  Its initial theatrical run was at the Allen Theaters Cineport 10 in Las Cruces, New Mexico  and it was released on DVD  by Colonel Fountain Productions, LLC, simultaneously with the film’s premiere.

After the initial release, the Albuquerque Journal reported that filmmakers Pilcher and Wilson "plan to show the movie at film festivals...to attract financing so they can expand it to a feature-length version, more than double the current length."

References

External links
 
 Official trailer released in 2012.
 Albert Fountain official website.

2013 films
2013 drama films
American drama films
2010s English-language films
2010s American films